Leland Jones Orser (born August 6, 1960) is an American actor. He has appeared in numerous film and television roles, notably as Lucien Dubenko in the television series ER (2004–2009) and Sam Gilroy in the Taken film series (2008–2014).

Career

Orser made his television debut in 1991 on the series Gabriel's Fire. His next roles were small roles on The Golden Girls, Cheers, L.A. Law, The X-Files, NYPD Blue, Law & Order: Special Victims Unit and CSI: Crime Scene Investigation.

In 1999, he played Dr. Arthur Zeller in The Outer Limits episode "Descent". He appeared in Seven (1995) as a man who was involuntarily recruited to kill a prostitute. He was credited as "Crazed Man in Massage Parlour". He played Larry Purvis in Alien Resurrection (1997).

He played the antagonist Richard Thompson in the Denzel Washington thriller The Bone Collector (1999). In 2001, he had a role in Pearl Harbor as an injured officer saved by Kate Beckinsale's character. In 2003, he appeared as Wesley in the comic-turned-film Daredevil. 

Orser also appeared in various roles in the Star Trek franchise, among them playing a Changeling posing as the Romulan Colonel Lovok in the Star Trek: Deep Space Nine episode "The Die is Cast" and in the episode "Sanctuary" playing a bit part as a member of the Skrreean race. He also played a homicidal hologram in the Star Trek: Voyager episode "Revulsion". In Star Trek: Enterprise, he played the character "Loomis" in the time-travel episode "Carpenter Street".

He played Ansel in the drama thriller film Faults. From 2004–09, he played Chief of Surgery Dr. Lucien Dubenko, a recurring character, on ER. Most recently he has appeared in all three of the Taken film series as "Sam".

Personal life
Orser was born in San Francisco, California  on August 6, 1960. He graduated from Connecticut College in 1982. He married Roma Downey in 1987; they divorced in 1989. In 2000, he married Jeanne Tripplehorn; they have one son. Orser studied Acting at Drama Studio London.

Filmography

Film

Television

References

External links
 

Living people
1960 births
Male actors from San Francisco
20th-century American male actors
21st-century American male actors
American male film actors
American male television actors
Connecticut College alumni